The Angelo Heights Historic District is a  historic district in San Angelo, Texas which was listed on the National Register of Historic Places in 1988.

It is a roughly T-shaped district covering parts of 11 blocks.  The district included 46 contributing buildings. It is roughly bounded by Colorado St., the Concho River, Live Oak St., S. Bishop St., Twohig St., and S. Washington St.

One building, the house at 309 S. Washington, was moved to its current location in 1930.

References

Historic districts on the National Register of Historic Places in Texas
National Register of Historic Places in Tom Green County, Texas
Victorian architecture in Texas